Qanat-e Malek (also Romanized as Qanāt-e Malek; also known as Qanāt-i-Malik) is a village in Baghestan Rural District, in the Central District of Bavanat County, Fars Province, Iran. At the 2006 census, its population was 252, in 69 families.

References 

Populated places in Bavanat County